The 1984 San Pedro Basin earthquake occurred on June 24 at  with a moment magnitude of 6.7 and a maximum  Mercalli intensity of VII (Very strong). The event occurred off the southern coast of the Dominican Republic and resulted in an estimated five fatalities.

Tectonic setting
The northern boundary of the Caribbean Plate is a diffuse zone of varied fault types. The Muertos Trough marks the southern portion of this zone of deformation with north dipping convergence.

Earthquake
This thrust earthquake occurred on a shallow and north-dipping fault and, at the time, it was the largest instrumentally recorded event in the Los Muertos Trough.

Intensity
The United States Geological Survey estimated that more than 227,000 people were exposed to intensity VII (Very strong) shaking and more than 2.8 million experienced intensity VI (Strong) shaking.

Aftershock
Five hours after the mainshock, a destructive 5.2  aftershock occurred about 5–10 miles to the northeast. Five deaths are also attributed to this event.

See also
Geography of the Dominican Republic
Hispaniola
List of earthquakes in the Caribbean

References

External links

Earthquakes in the Dominican Republic
1984 earthquakes